Charles Austin (born 5 July 1989) is an English professional footballer who plays as a striker for League Two club Swindon Town.

Released from his contract by Reading as a youth, Austin played non-league football up to May 2009, when he was signed by Swindon Town after a prolific season for Poole Town. After scoring 58 goals in 113 matches in the Football League Championship for Burnley and Queens Park Rangers, Austin made his debut in the Premier League during the 2014–15 season, scoring 18 goals for relegated Queens Park Rangers and receiving a call-up for the England national team. He returned to the Premier League in January 2016 when he signed for Southampton, scoring the winning goal against Manchester United on his debut.

Club career

Non-league
Born in Hungerford, Berkshire, Austin trained with Reading's youth teams as a youngster but was released for being too small when he was 15. He subsequently played for local team Kintbury Rangers and his hometown side Hungerford Town. Austin departed Hungerford in 2008 and was briefly on the books of Thatcham Town but ultimately left without making any appearances for the club.

Moving with his family to Bournemouth, he then switched to nearby semi-professional Wessex League Premier Division team Poole Town while also working as a bricklayer. In the season of 2008–09, Austin scored 46 goals in 46 appearances for Poole in all competitions.

Austin spent the pre-season of the 2009–10 season on trial with League Two club Bournemouth. Although Bournemouth's manager, Eddie Howe, was keen to sign the striker on a permanent deal, Bournemouth were unable to make a move for the striker due to a transfer embargo imposed on the club by the Football League. Austin continued to play for Poole Town, scoring 18 goals in 11 games at the beginning of the season.

Swindon Town
Austin was offered a trial at Swindon Town in September 2009 after Swindon Town's then chief scout Ken Ryder "stumbled across Charlie playing for Poole Town... and he scored four goals... and then the following week he scored three or four". After being watched for three games by the Swindon Town scouting team, Austin was asked to go on a week-long trial at Swindon Town. Austin impressed in his first reserve game against Swansea and scored a hat trick. Immediately afterwards, he was signed by Danny Wilson for an undisclosed fee and given a contract until the end of the season. He made his debut appearance for Swindon Town on 6 October in a 1–1 draw with Exeter in the 2009–10 Football League Trophy, replacing Ben Hutchinson as a substitute in the 88th minute. Austin made his Football League debut coming on in the 70th minute in the league match away at Norwich City on 24 October 2009 and on 21 November 2009, he scored his first professional goal in only the third minute of his full debut away at Carlisle United. He scored again on his full home debut three days later against Huddersfield Town, hitting the match-winner in the 59th minute for a 2–1 victory.

After forming a successful strike partnership with Billy Paynter and scoring 10 goals in 11 starts, Austin was rewarded with an extended two-and-a-half-year contract with the club in February 2010. On 14 May 2010, Austin scored the first goal as Swindon took a narrow 2–1 advantage in the first leg of the League One play-off semi-final against Charlton Athletic. In the second leg at Charlton, Swindon progressed to the final at Wembley after a penalty shoot-out in which Austin scored. Swindon lost the final 1–0 against Millwall; Austin found himself through on goal with an opportunity to equalise in the 72nd minute but shot wide after the ball bobbled on the Wembley turf as he struck the ball. At the end of his first season as a professional, Austin had scored 20 goals in 32 starts.

Despite suffering a dislocated shoulder in September, Austin scored another 17 goals in 27 games at the start of the 2010–11 season. His form prompted several Championship clubs to make offers for him during the January transfer window – all of which were rejected by Swindon. Disappointed at Swindon's reluctance to sell, Austin subsequently stated he was eager to play at a higher level and handed in a transfer request. Swindon accepted a bid from Ipswich Town just over a week later but they failed to agree personal terms with Austin and Burnley subsequently stepped in with an undisclosed fee which was also accepted.

Burnley
On 28 January 2011, Austin signed for Burnley on a three-and-a-half-year contract. He made his Burnley debut on 1 February in a 1–0 loss away to Doncaster Rovers. In his first full season with Burnley, Austin scored 16 goals in the Championship and finished the campaign as the club's top goalscorer in the league.

On 23 October 2012, Austin scored two goals in a 4–3 win over Bristol City, and subsequently equalled Ray Pointer's club record of scoring in eight consecutive appearances, which was achieved back during the 1958–59 season.

Two weeks later, on 6 November 2012, Austin broke another Burnley record as he became the quickest-ever player to reach 20 goals in a season after scoring in a 1–0 win over Leeds United — his 17th appearance of the season. The record was previously held by Bert Freeman, who scored 20 goals in his first 19 matches for the club during the 1911–12 season. He also became only the second-ever Burnley player to score 20 goals before the end of November after Andy Lochhead, who reached 20 goals in 25 games on 26 November 1966.
Austin managed to get his goal tally up to 23 goals by the end of the calendar year.

On 8 July 2013, a fee was agreed between Burnley and Premier League club Hull City for Austin. However, on 9 July 2013, Austin failed his medical and Hull pulled out of the deal.

Queens Park Rangers

Austin moved to Queens Park Rangers, on a three-year deal on 1 August 2013, for an undisclosed fee. He scored his first goal for QPR in a League Cup tie against Exeter City on 6 August 2013. On 14 September 2013, Austin scored his first league goal for QPR in a 1–0 win over Birmingham City at Loftus Road. On 28 September 2013, he scored a penalty in a 2–0 win at home to Middlesbrough. On 5 October 2013, he scored two goals including a penalty in a 2–0 win at home to Barnsley which increased his goal tally in the home and away season to 6. He scored his 100th professional goal and his 18th of the season in a 3–2 win over Barnsley. His 20th goal of the 2013–14 season sent QPR to Wembley as his team beat Wigan Athletic 2–1 on 12 May 2014.

On 6 December 2014, Austin scored against former club Burnley in a 2–0 win, but was later sent off for a second booking. Two weeks later, he scored his first Premier League hat-trick in a 3–2 win over West Bromwich Albion, bringing his league tally for the season up to 11. With five goals in five games in December 2014, he was awarded the Premier League Player of the Month award, becoming only the second QPR player to do so. By scoring a league hat-trick for QPR, Austin became the first Rangers player in more than ten years to achieve the feat, last performed by Jamie Cureton on 28 September 2004. On 24 May, Austin scored QPR's goal in a 5–1 final day defeat to Leicester City to finish the season as the fourth top goal scorer in the Premier League, with 18 goals.

Southampton
On 16 January 2016, Austin returned to the Premier League, joining Southampton on a four-and-a-half-year deal for a reported fee of £4 million. He made his debut for the club a week later against Manchester United, coming on as a second-half substitute for Sadio Mané, and scored a late winner, turning in a free-kick from James Ward-Prowse.

He scored his first two goals of the 2016–17 season on 15 September in a 3–0 Europa League win over Sparta Prague and went on to score four goals in a week, with goals against Swansea City in the Premier League and Crystal Palace in the EFL Cup. In Southampton's next Premier League fixture, at West Ham United, manager Claude Puel inserted Austin in the starting lineup over Shane Long, and Austin provided the first goal as well as an assist in the 3–0 victory.

On 23 December, Austin scored the opening goal in the 24th minute of a 1–1 draw with Huddersfield Town. Shortly afterwards, he caught Huddersfield keeper Jonas Lössl in the face with his boot. Late in the match, Austin went off with a hamstring injury which resulted in him being sidelined for several weeks. The following day, the Football Association gave Austin a three-match suspension for violent conduct.

West Bromwich Albion
Austin signed for Championship club West Bromwich Albion on 8 August 2019 on a two-year contract for a £4 million fee. He scored on his debut for West Brom in an EFL Cup tie against Millwall on 13 August 2019. Austin scored his first league goal for West Brom on 5 October 2019 against Cardiff City in a 4–2 win. Austin finished the 2019–20 season as the club's top scorer with 11 goals in all competitions, helping secure West Brom's return to the Premier league.

On 27 May 2021, it was announced that Charlie Austin would leave the club following the conclusion of his contract thus ending a 2-year stint at the club.

Return to QPR, and Brisbane Roar
On 9 January 2021, Austin rejoined Championship side Queens Park Rangers on loan for the remainder of the 2020–21 season. He made his debut on 12 January, scoring in a 2–0 victory at Luton Town. On 2 June, Austin returned to QPR permanently, signing a two-year deal. He scored his first goal since re-joining the club permanently with a last minute equaliser at home to Barnsley on 21 August. Austin left Queens Park Rangers at the end of the 2021–22 season after not making enough appearances to trigger a contract extension.

On 27 June 2022 Austin signed a multi-year contract for A-League Men side Brisbane Roar. He made his debut in the Australia Cup against Heidelberg United and scored in the penalty shootout. On 14 December, Austin left Brisbane after requesting a mutual termination of his contract, citing "family related reasons". Austin made 11 appearances and scored 4 goals for Brisbane Roar across all competitions.

Return to Swindon Town
On 30 December 2022, Austin returned to Swindon Town on a contract until the end of the 2022–23 season.

International career
On 21 May 2015, Austin was called up for the first time to the England national football team for a friendly match against the Republic of Ireland and a UEFA Euro 2016 qualifying match against Slovenia. He and Leicester City forward Jamie Vardy were called up due to several other forwards being involved in the European Under-21 Championship, but Austin did not feature in either match.

Personal life
Austin and his wife Bianca Austin (née Parker) have a daughter, born in August 2012 to a surrogate.

Austin was found guilty of assault in 2013 after he punched a man who had accused him of taking drugs in a Swindon nightclub toilet cubicle. He was fined £1,800 and ordered to pay £1,320 in costs.

Career statistics

Honours
Queens Park Rangers
Football League Championship play-offs: 2014

Southampton
EFL Cup runner-up: 2016–17

Individual
Premier League Player of the Month: December 2014

References

External links

Charlie Austin profile at Southampton F.C.

1989 births
Living people
People from Hungerford
Footballers from Berkshire
English footballers
Association football forwards
Kintbury Rangers F.C. players
Hungerford Town F.C. players
Thatcham Town F.C. players
Poole Town F.C. players
Swindon Town F.C. players
Burnley F.C. players
Queens Park Rangers F.C. players
Southampton F.C. players
West Bromwich Albion F.C. players
Brisbane Roar FC players
English Football League players
Premier League players
A-League Men players
English expatriate footballers
English expatriate sportspeople in Australia
Expatriate soccer players in Australia
English people convicted of assault
Wessex Football League players